The 2021 Qatar FA Cup was the first edition of the Qatari cup tournament in men's football. It was played by the bottom 8 teams from the Qatar Stars League and the entire Qatari Second Division.

The tournament featured 17 teams divided into 5 groups.

Round One Groups

Standings

Group A

Results

Group B

Results

Group C

Results

Group D

Results

Group E

Results

Knockout round

Quarter-finals

Semi-finals

Final

References

Football cup competitions in Qatar
Qatar FA Cup